Lagoa Azul (Portuguese for "blue lagoon") is a small bay in the northern part of the island of São Tomé in São Tomé and Príncipe. It is part of the Parque Natural Obô de São Tomé. It is 4 km northwest of the town Guadalupe. It is a popular spot for diving. There is a lighthouse near the bay, built in 1997.

See also
Geography of São Tomé and Príncipe

References

External links

Bays of São Tomé and Príncipe
Beaches of São Tomé and Príncipe
Lobata District